Re·ac·tor is the eleventh studio album by Canadian folk rock musician Neil Young, and his fourth with American rock band Crazy Horse, released on November 2, 1981. It was his last album released through Reprise Records before he moved to Geffen for his next five albums.

Content

Musical style 
The album marked Young's first use of the Synclavier, which would be featured heavily on the subsequent albums Trans (1982) and Landing on Water (1986).

The song "Shots" had originally been performed live in 1978 as a ballad.

In 2003, Greg Kot of Chicago Tribune proclaimed that Re·ac·tor "works up a punk-blues racket [...] that sounds as shaggy and disheveled as anything the Replacements recorded". AllMusic opined the album to contain "guitar-drenched hard rock made up of thrown-together material". Salon.com described the album as a proto-grunge effort. Peter J. Howe described it retrospectively in 1985 as "gritty post-punk".

Packaging 
The album features the Serenity Prayer on its back cover ("'Deus dona mihi serenitatem accipere res quae non possum mutare fortitudinem mutare res quae possum atque sapientiam differentiam cognoscere'" – "God grant me the serenity to accept the things I cannot change, the courage to change the things I can, and the wisdom to know the difference").

The original 1981 album gave Neil Young sole writing credit on every track, however the 2021 live release Way Down in the Rust Bucket added Frank Sampedro's name as a co-writer on "Surfer Joe and Moe the Sleaze".

Release 
It was unavailable on compact disc until it was released as a HDCD-encoded remastered version on August 19, 2003, as part of the Neil Young Archives Digital Masterpiece Series.

Reception 

William Ruhlmann of AllMusic is largely dismissive of Re·ac·tor in his retrospective review, awarding the record only two-out-of-five stars, although he praises "Shots" as " a more substantive and threatening song given a riveting performance".

Track listing
All tracks are written by Neil Young, except "Surfer Joe and Moe the Sleaze", written by Neil Young and Frank Sampedro.

Personnel
Neil Young – vocals, guitar, Synclavier, piano, handclaps
Crazy Horse
Frank Sampedro – guitar, synthesizer, vocals, handclaps
Billy Talbot – bass, vocals, handclaps
Ralph Molina – drums, percussion, vocals, handclaps

References

External links
Lyrics at HyperRust.org

1981 albums
Neil Young albums
Albums produced by David Briggs (producer)
Reprise Records albums
Albums produced by Neil Young
Hard rock albums by Canadian artists
Crazy Horse (band) albums
Punk blues albums
Punk rock albums by Canadian artists
Punk rock albums by American artists
Blues rock albums by American artists
Blues rock albums by Canadian artists
Krautrock albums